The Burnside-Sandusky Gothic House is a historic house located at 720 South 10th Street in St. Joseph, Missouri.

Description and history 
It was built in 1871, and is a -story, "T"-shaped, Gothic Revival style brick cottage. It has a steeply pitched cross-gable roof and a vernacular rear addition.

It was listed on the National Register of Historic Places on January 19, 2005.

References

Houses on the National Register of Historic Places in Missouri
Gothic Revival architecture in Missouri
Houses completed in 1871
Houses in St. Joseph, Missouri
National Register of Historic Places in Buchanan County, Missouri